Hernán Pérez Cuesta (born 2 October 1981), sometimes known as just Hernán, is a Spanish football manager and former player who played as a midfielder.

Playing career
Born in Oviedo, Asturias, Hernán was a Real Oviedo youth graduate, but made his senior debut with Tercera División side CD Lealtad in the 2000–01 season. He moved to Segunda División B side CD Universidad de Oviedo in 2001, suffering relegation and subsequently returning to Oviedo to play for the reserves in the fourth tier. 

In 2003, after the relegation of Oviedo's first team to the fourth division, the B-side disappeared and Hernán returned to Lealtad. In January of the following year, he signed for third tier side Real Avilés CF, again suffering relegation at the end of the season.

In 2005, after one season at fourth division side Oviedo ACF, Hernán rejoined Lealtad for a third spell. He left the club in August 2007 to join Caudal Deportivo also in division four, before moving to CD Covadonga in the same category in July 2008.

Hernán suffered relegation to the regional leagues with Covadonga in 2010, and retired in the following year at the age of just 30, as the club immediately returned to the fourth level.

Coaching career
During his last season at Covadonga, Pérez was already managing the youth sides of the club; he had previously worked at hometown sides UD San Claudio and CD Grujoan. In July 2012, he returned to his former side Lealtad as an assistant manager.

In July 2014, Pérez rejoined another club he represented as a player, Oviedo, to work as a manager of the Juvenil squad. He left the side on 12 June 2015, after being named in charge of UP Langreo in the fourth division.

Pérez achieved promotion to the third division with the side in the 2017–18 campaign, and was appointed Barakaldo CF manager on 12 July 2019. He left the latter side on 14 May 2020, after both parties agreed to not renew his contract, and was named in charge of Unionistas de Salamanca CF also in the third level on 5 June.

Pérez departed Unionistas on 14 June 2021, after qualifying the team to the new third level called Primera División RFEF, and joined Real Madrid's structure on 1 July, after being named manager of the Juvenil side. He left the latter in June 2022, after winning the year's Copa del Rey Juvenil de Fútbol.

On 16 June 2022, Pérez was appointed manager of Segunda División side CD Lugo. On 21 November, after being knocked out in the first stage of the Copa del Rey, he was sacked.

Personal life
Hernán's younger brother Michu was also a footballer. A forward, he too was groomed at Oviedo; both worked together at Langreo in 2015–16.

Managerial statistics

Honours

Manager
Real Madrid (youth)
Copa del Rey Juvenil de Fútbol: 2022

References

External links

1981 births
Living people
Footballers from Oviedo
Spanish footballers
Association football midfielders
Segunda División B players
Tercera División players
Divisiones Regionales de Fútbol players
CD Lealtad players
Real Oviedo Vetusta players
Real Avilés CF footballers
Caudal Deportivo footballers
Spanish football managers
Segunda División B managers
Tercera División managers
UP Langreo managers
Barakaldo CF managers
CD Lugo managers
Real Oviedo non-playing staff
Real Madrid CF non-playing staff